Stoney Ground is one of the fourteen Districts of Anguilla.  Its population at the 2011 census was 1,549.

Education
There is one government school in the town, Orealia Kelly Primary School. Albena Lake-Hodge Comprehensive School in The Valley serves secondary students.

Demographics

References

Populated places in Anguilla